Urban Games (Chinese: 城市游戏) is a 2014 Chinese-United States action-thriller film directed by Bob Brown and Zhang Peng and starring Shawn Dou and Michelle Chen. The film was released on May 16, 2014.

Cast
 Shawn Dou
 Michelle Chen
 Ashton Chen
 Ye Qing
 Cica Zhou
 Juno
Robert Gilabert Cuenca

References

External links
 

2014 films
2010s Mandarin-language films
Chinese action thriller films